Andriy Levchenko (born 1 January 1985) is a Ukrainian former volleyball player, a member of the Ukraine men's national volleyball team and Finnish club VaLePa Sastamala, a gold medalist of the 2017 European League.

After the end of the 2015/2016 season, he decided to end his volleyball career.

Sporting achievements

Clubs 
Ukrainian Cup:
  2004, 2006, 2007, 2009, 2010
Ukrainian Championship:
  2005, 2007, 2010, 2011
  2008
Latvian Championship:
  2009
French Championship:
  2012
Belarusian Championship:
  2013, 2014
Finnish Championship:
  2016

National Team 
Summer Universiade:
  2011
European League:
  2017

References

External links
Volleyball-Movies profile
CEV profile

1985 births
Living people
Sportspeople from Kharkiv
VC Lokomotyv Kharkiv players
Ukrainian men's volleyball players
Expatriate volleyball players in France
Expatriate volleyball players in Finland
Ukrainian expatriate sportspeople in Latvia
Ukrainian expatriate sportspeople in France
Ukrainian expatriate sportspeople in Belarus
Ukrainian expatriate sportspeople in Finland
Universiade silver medalists for Ukraine
Universiade medalists in volleyball
Medalists at the 2011 Summer Universiade